Thomas Michael Thurlow (born 11 December 1989) is a British entrepreneur, best known for epi-culture, a children's book company which specialised in signed first editions. He studied at Cheltenham Bournside School and Sixth Form Centre and started his business after his sister asked him to go to Chepstow for a JK Rowling book signing as she could not make it.

Thurlow appeared in ITV1's 2007 reality business show Tycoon, and was the first participant to be dismissed.

In December 2007 Thurlow was caught up in The Golden Compass furore and claimed to have received death threats from extremist American Catholics for selling the Philip Pullman books through his book company epi-culture.

In summer 2008, Thurlow presented Big Brother: On The Streets, a spin-off of Big Brother broadcast on E4's website.

In an interview with Entertainment Focus (an online showbiz site) Tom revealed his new online shows for 2008 which consisted of Meet The Freshers for the social networking site Bebo and a new companion show called MTV's Tom Takes On: The Hills for MTV.

In 2012, Thurlow created a series of dating sites, 'ShagAtUni.com' and 'ShagAGamer.com', aimed at the adult market. Website PCGamesN.com was critical of 'ShagAGamer.com', writing "...there is absolutely nothing wrong with the core concept behind Shag a Gamer, but there is something wrong when your dating website appears to be populated by fake or illegitimate users who repeatedly send out the same messages verbatim. It is wrong to give the impression that your dating website's userbase is made up entirely of gamers when it's in fact a portal to a generic dating database. It's wrong to have such an obtuse and unfriendly unsubscription process.". After these claims, the site publicly published its 'Customer Charter' which refuted all of these claims by PCGamesN.

References

21st-century English businesspeople
English child businesspeople
People from Cheltenham
1989 births
Living people